Frederick A. Hihn or F.A. Hihn (August 16, 1829 – August 23, 1913) served in the California legislature and was a prominent landowner.

History 
Born Friedrich August Ludewig Hühn in the Duchy of Brunswick in modern-day Germany, Hihn emigrated to California during the Gold Rush in 1849. After an unsuccessful stint as a miner, Hihn returned to San Francisco, where over the next several years he tried a handful of entrepreneurial activities, including selling candy, operating hotels, and owning both a drug store and a soap factory. In 1851 he moved to Santa Cruz, where he would remain for the next sixty years.

Hihn became the leading land developer in Santa Cruz County, California. In the 1860s, he acquired much of the former Rancho Soquel, including the beach resort area that became Capitola, California. With partner Claus Spreckels, Hihn built the Santa Cruz Railroad, first railroad into Santa Cruz County, completed in 1876.

Starting in 1865, Frederick A. Hihn and Elihu Anthony built the first private water supply network in the city of Santa Cruz and serving nearby communities.

In 1869, he ran for the California State Assembly as an Independent. He served only one term, but continued to be involved in local and regional politics, often to the advantage of his own businesses. The Hihn Company was a family timber business and owned 15,000 acres of land in Santa Cruz County of which 2,000 acres was redwood forests.

When he died in 1913, Hihn owned a wide variety of businesses, from lumber yards to hotels. His personal business empire increased the infrastructure and economic development of Santa Cruz.

References

Members of the California State Legislature
People from the Duchy of Brunswick
1829 births
California Independents
1913 deaths
People from Santa Cruz County, California